Pseudanthias is a genus of colourful reef fishes of the subfamily Anthiinae, part of the family Serranidae, the groupers and sea basses. They are found in the Indo-Pacific. The species belonging to this genus have a diet consisting of zooplankton, and are haremic. Fishes currently included in this genus were earlier part of the genus Anthias. Pseudanthias is the largest anthiine genus

Species
These are the currently recognized species in this genus:
 Pseudanthias albofasciatus (Fowler & B. A. Bean, 1930)
 Pseudanthias aurulentus (J. E. Randall & McCosker, 1982)
 Pseudanthias bartlettorum (J. E. Randall & Lubbock, 1981) (Bartletts' anthias)
 Pseudanthias bicolor (J. E. Randall, 1979) (Bicolor anthias)
 Pseudanthias bimaculatus (J. L. B. Smith, 1955) (Two-spot basslet)
 Pseudanthias bimarginatus J. E. Randall, 2011 (Margined anthias)
 Pseudanthias calloura H. Ida & Sakaue, 2001 (Aurora anthias)
 Pseudanthias caudalis Kamohara & Katayama, 1959
 Pseudanthias charleneae G. R. Allen & Erdmann, 2008 (Charlene's anthias)
 Pseudanthias cichlops (Bleeker, 1853)
 Pseudanthias connelli (Heemstra & J. E. Randall, 1986) (Harlequin goldie)
 Pseudanthias conspicuus (Heemstra, 1973)
 Pseudanthias cooperi (Regan, 1902) (Red-bar anthias)
 Pseudanthias dispar (Herre, 1955) (Peach fairy basslet) 	
 Pseudanthias elongatus (V. Franz, 1910)
 Pseudanthias engelhardi (G. R. Allen & Starck, 1982) (Orangebar anthias)
 Pseudanthias evansi (J. L. B. Smith, 1954) (Yellowback anthias)
 Pseudanthias fasciatus (Kamohara, 1955) (One-stripe anthias)	
 Pseudanthias flavicauda J. E. Randall & Pyle, 2001
 Pseudanthias flavoguttatus (Katayama & H. Masuda, 1980) (Yellow-spotted anthias)
 Pseudanthias fucinus (J. E. Randall & S. Ralston, 1985)
 Pseudanthias georgei (G. R. Allen, 1976) (George's basslet)
Pseudanthias hangapiko Shepherd, Pinheiro, Tyler A. Y. Phelps, Alejandro Pérez-Matus, L. A. Rocha- 2021  (Hanga Piko anthias)
 Pseudanthias hawaiiensis (J. E. Randall, 1979) (Hawaiian longfin anthias) 
 Pseudanthias heemstrai Schuhmacher, Krupp & J. E. Randall, 1989 (Orangehead anthias)
 Pseudanthias hiva J. E. Randall & Pyle, 2001 
 Pseudanthias huchtii (Bleeker, 1857) (Red-cheeked fairy basslet)
 Pseudanthias hutomoi (G. R. Allen & Burhanuddin, 1976) (Hutomo's anthias)
 Pseudanthias hypselosoma Bleeker, 1878 (Stocky anthias)
 Pseudanthias ignitus (J. E. Randall & Lubbock, 1981) (Flame anthias)
 Pseudanthias leucozonus (Katayama & H. Masuda, 1982)
 Pseudanthias lori (Lubbock & J. E. Randall, 1976) (Lori's anthias)
 Pseudanthias lunulatus (Kotthaus, 1973) (Lunate goldie)
 Pseudanthias luzonensis (Katayama & H. Masuda, 1983) (Yellowlined anthias)
 Pseudanthias manadensis (Bleeker, 1856) 
 Pseudanthias marcia J. E. Randall & J. P. Hoover, 1993 (Marcia's anthias)
 Pseudanthias mica G. R. Allen & Erdmann, 2012 (Mica's anthias)
 Pseudanthias mooreanus (Herre, 1935) 
 Pseudanthias morphoias (Kelsey Graham & Raja Ampat, Indonesia, 2022) (Morpho Butterfly Anthias)
 Pseudanthias nobilis (V. Franz, 1910)
 Pseudanthias olivaceus (J. E. Randall & McCosker, 1982)
 Pseudanthias oumati J. T. Williams, Delrieu-Trottin & Planes, 2013 (Saffron anthias) 
 Pseudanthias parvirostris (J. E. Randall & Lubbock, 1981) (Sunset anthias)
 Pseudanthias pascalus (D. S. Jordan & S. Tanaka (I), 1927) (Amethyst anthias)
 Pseudanthias pictilis (J. E. Randall & G. R. Allen, 1978) (Painted anthias)
 Pseudanthias pillai Heemstra & Akhilesh, 2012
 Pseudanthias pleurotaenia Bleeker, 1857 (Square-spot fairy basslet)
 Pseudanthias privitera J. E. Randall & Pyle, 2001 
 Pseudanthias pulcherrimus (Heemstra & J. E. Randall, 1986) (Resplendent goldie)
 Pseudanthias randalli (Lubbock & G. R. Allen, 1978) (Randall's fairy basslet)
 Pseudanthias regalis (J. E. Randall & Lubbock, 1981)
 Pseudanthias rubrizonatus (J. E. Randall, 1983) (Red-belted anthias)
 Pseudanthias rubrolineatus (Fourmanoir & Rivaton, 1979)
 Pseudanthias sheni J. E. Randall & G. R. Allen, 1989 (Shen's basslet)
 Pseudanthias smithvanizi (J. E. Randall & Lubbock, 1981) (Princess anthias)
 Pseudanthias squamipinnis (W. K. H. Peters, 1855) (Sea goldie)
 Pseudanthias taeniatus (Klunzinger, 1884)
 Pseudanthias taira E. J. Schmidt, 1931
 Pseudanthias thompsoni (Fowler, 1923) (Hawaiian anthias)
 Pseudanthias timanoa Victor, Antoine Teitelbaum & J. E. Randall
 Pseudanthias townsendi (Boulenger, 1897) (Townsend's anthias)
 Pseudanthias tuka Herre & H. R. Montalban, 1927 (Yellowstriped fairy basslet)
 Pseudanthias unimarginatus J. E. Randall, 2011
 Pseudanthias venator Snyder, 1911
 Pseudanthias ventralis (J. E. Randall, 1979) (longfin anthias)
 Pseudanthias vizagensis (Muddula Krishna Naranji & Govinda Rao Velamala, 2017)
 Pseudanthias xanthomaculatus (Fourmanoir & Rivaton, 1979)

References

 
Anthiinae
Taxa named by Pieter Bleeker
Marine fish genera